Norsemen Football Club is a football club based in Edmonton, England. They are currently members of the Southern Amateur League.

Colours, Crest and Motto
Norsemen play in blue with red socks. Their away strip is reversed, comprising red with blue socks. 
The club crest is that of a Viking and the club motto "Ret Frem" is based on the Norwegian, "Rett Frem", meaning "straightforward", "straight ahead", or "forthright".
The club currently runs eight adult mens sides, a comprehensive youth section from U9-U18 and a ladies section.

History
Founded in May 1895, from the ashes of Clapton-based club Orion Gymnasium, Norsemen (or rather, given their remote location in the growing London area – "The Northmen" as they were originally called) played their first game on 28 September 1895, beating Druids 2–1 in Neasden. Norsemen later joined the Southern Amateur League. In 1967, the club won the league, before being relegated to Division Two in 1972. In 1974, Norsemen were promoted back to the top tier of the Southern Amateur League. In 1978, the club entered the FA Vase for the first time, losing 4–3 against Swanley Town. In the 1982–83 edition of the FA Vase, Norsemen reached the third round, their furthest run in the competition.

Ground
Upon the formation of the club, Norsemen played behind the Cross Keys public house in Edmonton Green. In 1896, the club moved to Edmonton Cricket Club, where they remain to the present day.

Records
Best FA Vase performance: Third round, 1982–83
AFA Cup winners 1951–52, 1982–83, 1990–91; Runners-up 1938–1939, 2019–20 (https://en.wikipedia.org/wiki/Amateur_Football_Alliance_Senior_Cup)
SAL Champions 1966–67, 1997–98 (https://en.wikipedia.org/wiki/Southern_Amateur_Football_League#League_champions_and_Cup_winners)

References

External links

Southern Amateur Football League
1895 establishments in England
Sport in the London Borough of Enfield
Edmonton, London
Association football clubs established in 1895
Football clubs in England
Amateur association football teams
Football clubs in London